The Daimler DS420, also known as the Daimler Limousine, is a limousine made by The Daimler Company Limited between 1968 and 1992. The car was designed for official use and it was popular with chauffeur services, hoteliers and undertakers. It was used as an official state car in many countries. No other limousine model has been delivered to more reigning monarchs than the DS420, and the car is still used by the royal houses of the United Kingdom, Sweden, Denmark, and Luxembourg.

Origins
The Daimler Company was purchased by Jaguar Cars in 1960, which itself was bought by the British Motor Corporation (BMC) in 1966 and became part of the larger British Leyland conglomerate in 1968. BMC and Jaguar each had their own limousines before merging operations: the Vanden Plas Princess and the Daimler DR450, respectively. Rather than build two competing products, they decided to consolidate limousine production to a single model under the Daimler marque. Most of the engineering of the DS420 would be carried out by Jaguar, the new model to share parts such as the engine, gearbox, and suspension with the Jaguar 420G. Production of the DS420 was announced in June 1968, with the cars being built at the Vanden Plas works in Kingsbury. The short designation DS420 was in accordance with earlier Daimler designations where the first letter stood for Daimler, the second letter was part of an alphabetical sequence (i.e. the predecessor was "DR", thus the successor was "DS"), and "420" referred to the  displacement of the XK engine.

Description
The DS420 was built on the floorpan of Jaguar's 420G flagship model with the Jaguar wheelbase extended . The front styling was like the current Daimler Sovereign with the traditional Daimler fluted grille and the headlights of the Jaguar 420G. The new limousine also shared the 420G's twin  fuel tanks set in each of the rear wings, each with its own electric SU pump selected by a dashboard-mounted switch.

The passengers were seated behind a bulkhead with a sliding window that separated them from the driver's compartment.

In comparison to a Rolls-Royce Phantom VI, the DS420's wheelbase was  shorter, its body  shorter, it was approximately  lighter, and its engine had only about two-thirds the displacement of the Rolls-Royce V8. As such, the Daimler was less expensive than a Rolls-Royce, less than half the price of a standard long-wheelbase (Silver Wraith) Rolls-Royce Silver Shadow.

Production

Originally, the cars were built at the Vanden Plas works in Kingsbury Lane, London, from body shells made by Park Sheet Metal Company, assembling panels supplied by Motor Panels of Coventry, and by Pressed Steel Fisher. Early limousines bore the "Daimler Vanden Plas" designation on tread plates and workshop manuals. The Kingsbury plant was closed in 1979 and production moved to Jaguar in Coventry, where it continued until 1992. The move to Coventry also brought the second and most extensive facelift in the car's life, when larger bumpers and a revised rear number-plate frame were fitted.

The previous facelift had occurred in 1972 modernizing the window arrangement for the rear passengers. This involved a change from the previous design's division glass design (split between one vertically sliding portion and one fixed pane) to one single window that could slide up and down. It also addressed the corrosion issue of earlier cars (which was related to the division glass), slightly changed the dimensions of the grille, exterior badge placement, and reduced the amount of woodwork in the interior. The third and final facelift came in 1987, with the change to new, plastic-coated bumpers and minor changes to the interior. This last model, known as the "Mk IV", was produced until 1992, when Jaguar/Daimler ceased production of their last coach-built limousine. The factory also supplied part-bodies to external coach-builders to allow them to construct hearses.

Delivered vehicles varied from very basic models, with manually operated windows, to a model—reportedly produced in 1984 for the use of Jaguar boss John Egan—that was outfitted as a mobile boardroom, complete with a TV, computer, printer, and cocktail cabinet. The DS420 had an extensive list of additional options. Private owners tended to fully option their cars, while the service industry, including the funeral trade and limousine companies, tended to want few options. Until the early 1980s, after their purchase by Hertz, Daimler Hire was one of the largest clients. Daimler Hire cars were offered as limousine transportation, as well as for state and official use. Most Daimler Hire cars were well equipped with options, including electric division window, air conditioning, matching leather interiors, and the bonnet flag mount for ceremonial use.

The DS420 had a fascia very similar to contemporary Mark X and 420G Jaguars retaining the old-fashioned steering column and pencil-thin steering wheel. Two cars were built in landaulette bodywork by the factory. Apparently neither have survived.

By 1992, the DS420 was the only model in the Jaguar range still using the XK engine, along with other parts of the drive train and suspension; and, although the car still appealed to its traditional customers, production was no longer economical. The last DS420, registered L420 YAC, was built in Browns Lane towards the end of 1992 and is the last production car built to have an XK engine installed. This is in the care of the Jaguar Daimler Heritage Trust. No direct replacement was produced by Jaguar, although coach builders have adapted the Daimler version of the XJ6.

Customers

The Daimler DS420 is widely used among the funeral trade, serving as both the executive car for mourning relatives and the hearse, after customization, for the deceased. The most prominent funeral with a Daimler Limousine and hearse was that of Diana, the Princess of Wales in 1997. Diana's coffin was transported in a 1985 Daimler hearse from RAF Northolt to St. James Palace for a lying in state. Her two sisters followed in a 1992 Daimler Limousine belonging to the Queen.

The limousines have also been used to transport representatives of Queen Elizabeth II worldwide, as well as diplomatic missions in London, including governors of Hong Kong, the High Commissioner of New Zealand, the Governor of Tasmania, and the Governor of Guernsey. A Daimler Limousine still serves the Lieutenant Governor of Jersey. Diplomatic missions that have used the DS420 include Jordan, Oman, Portugal, and Spain. The DS420 was also the choice of other governments who were looking for an appropriate car to transport dignitaries during state visits or for use by their own officials on formal occasions, such governments including those of Australia and New Zealand.

The vehicles were also used by hotels that provided them to their guests for transportation.  The Regent Hotel in Hong Kong (today known as the InterContinental Hong Kong) had, over the years, no less than 22 in service for its guests.

Royal tradition

Daimler is the only manufacturer that has delivered automobiles to all five monarchs of the United Kingdom since 1901. This preference was mirrored by monarchs worldwide, and Rolls-Royce had to settle for second place in deliveries to monarchs apart from maharajahs. After his marriage to Princess Elizabeth in 1948, Prince Philip opened the door to Rolls-Royce with an order for a private car, a Rolls-Royce Phantom IV. It was delivered in 1950 and became part of the official fleet in 1952 when Princess Elizabeth became Queen. Despite this, the Daimler Straight Eight (DE36) remained the favorite among reigning monarchs, including King Bhumibol Adulyadej of Thailand, King Mohammed Zahir of Afghanistan, Emperor Haile Selassie of Ethiopia, Queen Wilhelmina of the Netherlands and Prince Rainier of Monaco.

This Daimler supremacy changed with the next generation of cars, the Rolls-Royce Phantom V being more successful, with orders from five reigning monarchs—Queen Elizabeth II of the United Kingdom, King Hussein of Jordan, Emperor Hirohito of Japan, Hakim Isa ibn Salman Al Khalifa of Bahrain and Emir Sabbah III of Kuwait—while the Daimler DR450 was delivered to King Bhumibol Adulyadej of Thailand and King Hussein of Jordan. The man who had chosen "Grace, Space, Pace" as the motto of his Jaguar cars, William Lyons, was to change this and had the new Daimler DS420 launched in the same year as the new Rolls-Royce Phantom VI. The new Daimler was to re-establish Daimler supremacy in royal courts, starting with King Frederick IX. of Denmark who would experience the very first Daimler Limousine, a pre-production demonstrator on his visit to London in April 1968 and later ordered a production model, in black paint, delivered in March 1970.

This first order of the new model by a monarch was touted by Daimler in a supplement to their sales brochure, which showed King Frederick's new car in front of Christiansborg Palace. After the death of King Frederik IX, it served his successor Queen Margrethe II, the dowager Queen Ingrid, and Crown Prince Frederik at his 2004 wedding to Crown Princess Mary. In 2008, the Daimler would again serve in the same role at the wedding of Prince Joachim and Princess Marie, whom the Limousine then served subsequently. This first DS420 Limousine delivered to a monarch is still with the Queen's fleet and thus has served the Danish court for almost half a century.

Prince Rainier III. of Monaco also took delivery of a DS420 in 1970, even taking a flight to the UK in November 1970 to take delivery ( chassis nr. 1M 20033) directly and having it shipped to Nice airport in a cargo aircraft. His DS420 had exterior two-tone paint of "silk" over black, the same as his previous car, a Rolls-Royce. "Silk" in this context is a mixture of gold, silver and pale green. The Daimler carried a blue bullet lamp on the roof and served the prince as state car until his death in 2005. The Limousine is displayed in Monaco's Automobile Museum, which was founded by the Prince in Monte Carlo.

The greatest adherent of the DS420 was undoubtedly Queen Elizabeth The Queen Mother. She even visited the Vanden Plas factory when her first order neared completion to supervise changes according to her taste. Between 1970 and her death in 2002, no less than five separate DS420s had served her (delivered in 1970, 1978, 1983, 1986, and 1992). They were all painted in the royal colour combination of "Black over Royal Claret", had a blue bullet lamp on the roof, and carried the Registration "NLT 1" or, later, "NLT2". It was the express wish of the Queen Mother that after her death her final DS420 should be given to the Jaguar Daimler Heritage Trust (JDHT), which today cares for the presentation of the limousine (with new registration K123 EYL) either at the museum at Gaydon or at rallies.

King Hussein of Jordan ordered a Daimler Limousine in 1970. It was painted in the colour "Sand" and served various duties, including bringing King Abdullah II to school when he was young. The Limousine today is on display at the Royal Automobile Museum at Amman.

Grand Duke Jean of Luxembourg ordered a Daimler DS420 in 1970, as his new state car, taking delivery in 1971. The Limousine (with chassis nr. 1M 20042) was painted in "Westminster Blue" and served him until 1988, when he replaced it with a new DS420 in the same colour.

Sultan Qaboos of Oman was the next monarch opting for the new Daimler. He took delivery two cars of identical configuration in black paint and with black leather in the front compartment and fawn West of England cloth in the rear compartment. The Limousines had the chassis-numbers 1M 20051 and 1M 20052 and were delivered in January 1972.

Following the death of her father King Frederick IX in 1972, both his daughter and successor, Queen Margrethe II of Denmark and Dowager Queen Ingrid wanted the use of the Daimler; and so another DS420 was ordered, which was delivered in 1974. It was the same as the first except for a small change in the layout of the rear side windows. Queen Ingrid opted for the newer car (with chassis nr. 1M 20103) and used it both privately and for official duties. A typical working day started with accompanying her grandsons to school before heading for her public engagements.

King Yahya Petra of Malaysia was the first monarch from the Far East to order the Daimler Limousine, of which (chassis nr. 1M 3494 BW) he took delivery in the second half of 1977.

He was followed by Sultan Hassanal Bolkiah of Brunei who had his 1981 Limousine based and registered in England where he has several retreats.

1984 was to be a special year for Daimler. With eight orders by reigning monarchs from all over the world, the record of the Straight Eight was already broken. One important customer was still without a DS420, until Queen Elizabeth II placed her first order for a Daimler Limousine. Her DS420 (chassis nr. 200477) was to serve mostly as transport for her son Prince Charles and his young spouse Lady Diana. As with the models supplied to the Queen Mother, it was painted black over royal claret and carried a blue bullet lamp.

By 1986 time was ripe for the third order from the Danish court to replace one of the two limousines in frequent use, but it was to replace the newer, not the older car—most likely for sentimental reasons, allowing dowager Queen Ingrid to continue with the Daimler her husband King Frederick IX had ordered. Queen Margrethe II had the new DS420 painted "Westminster Blue".

1987 saw the 35-year anniversary of the reign of Queen Elizabeth II and a welcome occasion for the rejuvenation of her fleet of cars. The two Vanden Plas Princess Limousines were discontinued, as was the Rolls-Royce Phantom IV Landaulet. Both manufacturers were allowed to deliver a new model to the Royal Mews—Rolls-Royce delivered a Phantom VI with standard limousine body, and Daimler a DS420 Limousine with the facelift introduced the same year. The 1987 Daimler Limousine (chassis nr. 200970) served TRH Prince Charles, Diana Princess of Wales and their sons Prince William and Prince Harry, for whom the occasional seats seemed tailor-made. The most frequent user was Sarah Fergusson, the Duchess of York, during official engagements. The Queen used it for less formal occasions that did not necessitate the use of a state car. Who was using the Daimler Limousine could be determined by the flag shield carried on the roof behind the blue bullet lamp: the Queen would mount her personal flag shield, such as during her visit to Snettisham in 1992. Other members of the royal family could display their personal flag shields as well but regularly used the flag shield with the vice-regal crown, which is also mounted when other dignitaries are being transported, such as the private secretaries, the ladies-in-waiting, the mistress of the robes, or the spouses of foreign heads of state, accompanied by Prince Philip, following the state car. The 1987 Daimler Limousine was the first example of the latest generation to be supplied to a royal court. The revised layout was to generate further orders from reigning monarchs.

In 1950, at the Swedish court, a Daimler 4-litre Hooper Limousine was elected to serve as a state car. By 1987, a modern alternative was sought after and found in the DS420 Limousine. The black Daimler (chassis nr. 201045) was finished in October 1987 and subsequently handed over to King Carl XVI Gustaf of Sweden. It is still in service, but for lesser official engagements the Swedish King makes use of modern saloons.

In Luxembourg, as well, the revised design prompted a new order. In September 1988, Grand Duke Jean replaced his 1971 Daimler Limousine with another in "Westminster Blue" (chassis nr. 201168).

By this time, Queen Elizabeth II had already been supplied her third DS420 Limousine (chassis nr. 201127), which was delivered in August 1988, to replace the 1984 model. Apart from a small detail in the interior, it had an identical configuration as the 1987 model.

By 1992 this chapter could have ended, because production of the DS 420 Limousine was discontinued. Of the four final examples produced, one went to the Jaguar Daimler Heritage Trust, another to the Queen Mother (chassis nr. 201629) and an identically equipped pair to Queen Elizabeth II. (chassis nrs. 201628 and 201630). The Daimler Limousine had survived its rival Rolls-Royce Phantom VI by one year. Both manufacturers had to adhere to new requirements such as crash-tests and emission-regulations. The XK-engine from the 1950s and the chassis from the 1960s were the limiting factors, but not a lack of desire on the part of royalty. Both the two 1992 models and the 1988 model are still serving Queen Elizabeth as semi-state cars and were used at the weddings of Prince Edward, Prince William, Prince Harry, and Princess Eugenie.

Queen Margrethe II of Denmark would have liked one DS420 as well, but where to get one after end of production, when monarchs are not customers on the used-car market. The Danish Queen was lucky to find a pristine example, with almost no mileage on the odometer, that was kept in reserve by a Swedish importer since 1987. It was also in "Westminster Blue", such as was the 1986 model of the Queen. Likely intended as a supplement for the Swedish King, this 1987 Daimler Limousine (chassis nr. 201065) was delivered to the Danish Queen in 1994. This newest model in her fleet was not to become number 1 immediately. The cars of the Danish court have license plates with a crown and a number. The Daimlers had Crown 1, Crown 2, and Crown 5, but in changeable arrangements. At the wedding of Crown Prince Frederik in 2004, the oldest Daimler still carried Crown 1 while the youngest from 1987 had to settle for Crown 5. At a later date they changed registrations, and the 1987 Limousine is now the car for the daily duties of the Queen, despite its age. The Daimler even sometimes replaces the Rolls-Royce Silver Wraith as the state car. The 1986 model with Registration Crown 2 that had served the Crown Prince and his wife on several occasions since 2004 is since 2011 exclusively used by them.

A final change worth mentioning in this context took place in Luxembourg in 2000 when Grand Duke Jean abdicated and his son became Grand Duke Henri of Luxembourg. The Daimler Limousine remained as the state car after the change, and is in service today. It is definitely the Daimler with the greatest variety of registrations. When hosting state visits or at the parade on National Day it carries a plate that simply displays a crown symbol. In "everyday" duty with the Grand Duke, the plate displays a simple "1". At the wedding of the Hereditary Grand Duke Guillaume to Stephanie de Lannoy in October 2012, the plate displayed an orange and a blue stripe, the colors of the House of Weilburg-Nassau. At the wedding of the nephew of the Grand Duke, who belongs to the House of Habsburg, in Nancy later that year, the corresponding colors of black and yellow were displayed. When the Daimler Limousine is driven outside Luxembourg it carries a diplomatic plate.

The Daimler DS420 can claim a special royal record. The rear compartment allows up to six passengers, the occasional seats favouring children. There is no other car that had the honour to carry six members of a reigning royal family at the same time except the Daimler Limousine. Both sons of Queen Margrethe II of Denmark have four children and they can be seen travelling together with their parents in the rear of the Daimlers. On the other hand, royals sometimes can be found in the drivers compartment of the DS420, such as Prince William in August 1999 or Princess Anne leaving Easter Service at Windsor Chapel in 2016.

With orders from no less than ten reigning monarchs, the Daimler DS420 not just side-lined the Rolls-Royce Phantom VI which could only boast orders from the King of Thailand and the Sultan of Brunei, but all other models produced in automobile history. If any model can claim the appellation of "Royal", it is the Daimler DS420. It highlights the special significance of this model that it is still in use by the courts of the United Kingdom, Denmark, Sweden, and Luxembourg, despite its production having ended more than a quarter of a century ago and despite the discontinuation of the Daimler marque since 2008. Considering this,

Sources

External links 
Hendrik-Jan Thomassen's comprehensive archive of DS420 documentation
Craig Tiano's DS420 site
Royal DS420 Limousines of Luxembourg
Royal DS420 Limousine of Sweden 
Royal DS420 Limousines of Denmark

DS420
1970s cars
1980s cars
Full-size vehicles
Cars introduced in 1968
Luxury vehicles
Limousines